Theodoros Pangalos (born 17 August 1938) is a Greek politician and leading member of the Panhellenic Socialist Movement (PASOK). He served as the Deputy Prime Minister of Greece, responsible for the coordination of the Government Council for Foreign Affairs and Defense (KYSEA) and the new Economic & Social Policy Committee from 2009 to 2012

Early life 
Pangalos was born in Eleusis, Greece. He is the grandson of General and 1926 dictator Theodoros Pangalos. Some of his ancestors were Arvanites.

Pangalos was member of the left-wing Lambrakis Youth and, in 1964, a candidate for the Hellenic Parliament with the United Democratic Left (EDA). Pangalos opposed the 1967 military dictatorship, and was deprived by the junta of his Greek citizenship in 1968.

Political career 
He became a member of the Communist Party of Greece (KKE), rising to its Central Committee, before eventually joining the PASOK socialist party during the Metapolitefsi. He was elected for the first time as an MP in the 1981 general election with PASOK and has been continuously re-elected since until 2012.

In 1996 he was appointed Minister for Foreign Affairs and held the post until his resignation in 1999, in the aftermath of the scandal involving the leader of PKK, recognized as a terrorist organization by EU, Abdullah Öcalan: helped by individual members of the Greek intelligence agencies Öcalan entered Greece illegally and was then deported to Kenya, where he was captured by Turkish agents after leaving the Greek embassy at Nairobi. 

Pangalos came under fire when he said in 2018 on a radio show “The only good Turk is a dead Turk. I believe this because I have not come across a good Turk. They lack basic appreciation.”

He was briefly made Minister for Culture in 2000, an appointment which was widely criticized, in view of his previous statement that artists who had protested his handling of the Öcalan affair were kuradomanges (Greek: κουραδόμαγκες) (turd tough guys).

Quotes 
"Mazi ta fagame" (Greek: μαζί τα φάγαμε) ( "we ate them together", meaning "we are all responsible for the debt").

In popular culture 
A Greek experimental pop band named Plastic Flowers sampled his famous speech "mazi ta fagame" in their song "Sinking ship-vanished crew".

References

External links 
 Official website of Theodoros Pangalos 
 
 

|-

1938 births
Arvanites
Deputy Prime Ministers of Greece
Foreign ministers of Greece
20th-century Greek lawyers
Greek MPs 1981–1985
Greek MPs 1985–1989
Greek MPs 1989 (June–November)
Greek MPs 1989–1990
Greek MPs 1990–1993
Greek MPs 1993–1996
Greek MPs 1996–2000
Greek MPs 2000–2004
Greek MPs 2004–2007
Greek MPs 2007–2009
Greek MPs 2009–2012
Living people
Members of the Lambrakis Democratic Youth
PASOK politicians
People from Elefsina
Culture ministers of Greece
Ministers of Transport and Communications of Greece